Buchanan Street station may refer to:
 Buchanan Street railway station, a closed railway station in Glasgow.
 Buchanan Street subway station, a subway station also in Glasgow.